Parlez vous or variant, may refer to:

 A parley
 Alternate spelling of Parley Voo
 "Parlez Vous" (song), a variant of the WWI song Mademoiselle from Armentières
 Parlez Vous (film), a 1930 short film by Stanley Bergerman
 "Parlez Vous?" (episode), a 1978 TV episode of The Love Boat

See also

 Parlez-Vous English (album)
 "Parlez-Vous Anglais" (song)
 "Parlez Vous Francais?" (song)
 "Parlez-vous français ?" (song)
 
 Parlez-moi d'amour (disambiguation)
 Parler (disambiguation)
 Parley (disambiguation)